Pannekoek is a lunar impact crater that is situated on the far side of the Moon, and cannot be seen directly from the Earth. The crater lies along the northern edge of the slightly larger Dellinger, and their common border forms an area of uneven terrain. Due north of Pannekoek is the huge walled plain Mendeleev. The crater is named after astronomer and father of Council Communism, Antonie Pannekoek.

This is a worn and eroded crater, although the perimeter of the rim is still visible. The southern part of the interior floor is jumbled and irregular. There is a small crater next to the inner wall along the west-southwest part of the floor. A smaller crater also lies in the interior along the northeast inner wall. There are also several small craterlets on the floor.

Satellite craters
By convention, these features are identified on lunar maps by placing the letter on the side of the crater midpoint that is closest to Pannekoek.

Pannekoek S is similar to a few other far-side craters like Mandel'shtam Q and Barbier F that have hummocky floors.

References

 
 
 
 
 
 
 
 
 
 
 
 

Impact craters on the Moon